Metironeus is a genus of beetles in the family Cerambycidae, containing the following species:

 Metironeus hesperus Chemsak, 1991
 Metironeus hovorei Chemsak, 1991

References

Elaphidiini